Elizabeth Lindsay Davis (1855-1944) was an African-American teacher and activist. She was responsible for forming the Phyllis Wheatley Women's Club in Chicago, Illinois in 1900. Over the course of her life, she participated and contributed to the advancement of African-American women. In 1922, she wrote The Story of the Illinois Federation of Colored Women's Clubs, a book highlighting the history of women's organizations and their notable members in the state of Illinois. In 1933, she published her book Lifting as They Climb about the history of the National Association of Colored Women. During her life, she collaborated with Ida B. Wells and W.E.B. DuBois to contribute to the progress and to support African-American women during the early 20th century.

Life

Elizabeth L. Davis was born in 1855 to Thomas and Sophia Jane Lindsay in the town of Peoria, Illinois.  She later attended and graduated from high school in Princeton, Illinois.  She subsequently taught school in various towns, and married William Davis in 1885.  They moved to Chicago in 1893.

References

1855 births
1944 deaths
African-American women writers
African-American activists
African-American writers
African-American educators
20th-century African-American people
20th-century African-American women